Osornophryne bufoniformis is a species of toad in the family Bufonidae. It is found in the Andes of southern Colombia (Colombian Massif) and northern Ecuador. Common name Peracca's plump toad has been proposed for it, in allusion to Mario Giacinto Peracca, the scientist who described this species in 1904.

Description
Adult males measure  and adult females  in snout–vent length. The occipital ridges are low or absent. The limbs are short and thin. The fingers and the toes have fleshy webbing. The dorsum is covered with numerous round pustules of different sizes. Dorsal coloration is black-brown, dark brown, light brown, or reddish brown. A yellow or light brown glandular dorsolateral line can be present. The belly is light or dark brown with yellow or red pustules.

Habitat and conservation
They can be found on fallen leaves and on the ground, but also in terrestrial bromeliads and on vegetation up to half a meter above the ground. Development is direct (i.e, there is no free-living larval stage).

It is a rare species that is uncommon even when present. It is threatened by habitat loss (deforestation) caused by agricultural development, cultivation of illegal crops, fire, logging, and human settlements. Pollution resulting from the spraying of illegal crops is also a threat. It is present in several protected areas.

References

bufoniformis
Amphibians of the Andes
Amphibians of Colombia
Amphibians of Ecuador
Amphibians described in 1904
Taxa named by Mario Giacinto Peracca
Taxonomy articles created by Polbot